The M81 is a short metropolitan route in Greater Johannesburg, South Africa. It connects Craighall Park with Bryanston. For its entire route, it is named William Nicole Drive.

Route 
The M81 begins as William Nicol Drive in Hyde Park at the intersection with Jan Smuts Avenue (M27). William Nicol Drive starts at the Hyde Park Corner Shopping Mall and heads north passing through the suburbs of Hyde Park, Sandhurst and Hurlingham. In Parkmore, the M75 Sandton Drive intercepts the route as a T-junction, the main route to Sandton City. Turning north-west, the route crosses the Braamfontein Spruit in Hurlingham Manor and is intersected at a T-junction with the westbound Republic Road (M13), the main road to Randburg. It turns north and passes through Sandton and into Bryanston. Here it crosses the major road junctions of Main (M71) and Grosvenor Roads (M64). It continues north-westwards crossing Bryanston Drive (M74) and shortly reaches the N1 Western Bypass junction no. 95. Here, the M81 ends but William Nicol Drive continues north-north-west as the R511.

References 

Streets and roads of Johannesburg
Metropolitan routes in Johannesburg